Il tiranno di Siracusa (English Release Title: Damon and Pythias) is a 1962 Italian/American film directed by Curtis Bernhardt.  The film is based on the Greek legend of Damon and Pythias, and set during the reign of Dionysius I of Syracuse (432-367 BC).

Plot summary

In Ancient Greece, Protheus, the leader of the Pythagorian society in Athens, dies. Fellow Pythagorian Pythias is ordered to go to Syracuse and convince the philosopher Arcanos to return with him and take Protheus' place.  Arcanos, however, has fled into hiding because of the tyrannical king Dionysius the Elder, and his captain of the guard Cariso. These two ruthlessly hunt down and destroy anyone involved in this "dangerous" philosophy, as the Pythagorians call all men brothers/equal and embrace pacifism over war and conquest.

Fearing that his pregnant wife Nerissa will be too upset if he tells her himself, Pythias leaves his brother-in-law Demetrius to tell her of his dangerous mission. Nerissa interprets this as Pythias loving his philosophy more than her, and falls severely ill. Meanwhile, Pythias arrives in Syracuse, and meets streetwise local con man and bandit Damon. Damon initially tries to rob Pythias, until the pair are chased by Cariso and his guards. Pythias offers Damon a great amount of silver if he can help him find Arcanos, and Damon agrees to hide Pythias in his lair. Initially, Damon mocks Pythias for his beliefs, his pacifism, and his attempts to befriend everyone. However, Damon still organizes his fellow bandits and street people to help him find Arcanos for the money. Cariso then offers Damon much gold, and a prize stallion, if Damon will betray Pythias and help HIM find and kill Arcanos. Damon agrees; Pythias is furious when he finds out Damon double-crossed him, but still refuses, even when he has Damon helpless, to harm or kill him.

Damon, realizing he lost what could have been his first true friend, follows Pythias, makes amends, and tries to help him and Arcanos escape. Arcanos and Damon succeed; however, Pythias crashes his chariot, and is arrested by Cariso. Demetrius arrives in Syracuse and informs Damon that Nerissa is expected to die before the baby is born. Damon goes to King Dionysisus and offers himself as a substitute prisoner; the king initially refuses, until he realizes he can use this situation to discredit the Pythagorians. He offers Pythias three choices: be executed as planned, leave and allow Damon to die in his place, or leave but return at the end of two months to die in Damon's place. Pythias and Damon accept the third option, and Pythias returns home. The whole of Syracuse learns of the wager, and Dionysius believes that Pythias will not return and therefore will prove his own philosophy ineffective. However, to be safe, he orders Cariso to kill Pythias if he somehow does try to return.

Pythias returns to Nerissa, who regains her will to live and gives birth to a healthy baby boy, whom they name Damon. Pythias then breaks the news to her and returns to Syracuse. Cariso and his men do everything they can to find and stop him, but Damon's gang decides to aid and shelter him. Pythias is forced to fight Cariso himself, but Damon's gang and several other street people step in to help, killing the captain. Damon is led to the square and Dionysius mocks his loyalty, but Damon openly accuses him of hindering Pythias. Pythias then arrives to take Damon's place before the archers. Dionysius accuses him of killing Cariso, in an effort to discredit his pacifism, but Damon's gang takes all the blame. The tyrant then orders Pythias' execution, but by now the people have seen the power of loyal friendship. Dionysius' own son leads the people in begging the king to let both prisoners live; Dionysius, after hesitating, graciously admits defeat and pardons them, as the crowd celebrates.

Cast
Guy Williams as Damon
 Don Burnett as Pythias
Ilaria Occhini as Nerissa
Liana Orfei as Adriana
Marina Berti as Mereka, Damon's sister
Arnoldo Foà as Dionysius the Tyrant
Carlo Giustini as Cariso
Aldo Silvani as Patriarch
Andrea Bosic as Arcanos
Franco Fantasia as Rumius the Fencing Master
Lawrence Montaigne as Flute Player
Enrico Glori as Nikos
Gianni Bonagura as Philemon
Carolyn De Fonseca as Chloe
 Carlo Rizzo as Libia

Production
Jaffe and Marx wanted the leads played by John Gavin and James Garner.

Reception
The film made a profit of $6,000.

Release
The international distribution was taken over by MGM.

Biography

References

External links

1962 films
1962 adventure films
English-language Italian films
Films directed by Curtis Bernhardt
Films set in classical antiquity
Films based on classical mythology
Films based on works by Friedrich Schiller
Films based on poems
Peplum films
Metro-Goldwyn-Mayer films
Films set in the 5th century BC
Films set in the 4th century BC
Films scored by Angelo Francesco Lavagnino
Sword and sandal films
1960s English-language films
1960s Italian films